Remigration, or re-immigration, sometimes euphemized as "repatriation", is a far-right political concept referring to the forced or promoted return of non-ethnically European immigrants, often including their descendants, back to their place of racial origin regardless of citizenship status. This idea is especially popular within the Identitarian movement in Europe. Most proponents of remigration suggest leaving some residents with non-European background aside from the forced return, based on a vaguely defined degree of assimilation into European culture.

Advocates of remigration promote the concept in pursuit of ethno-cultural homogeneity. According to Deutsche Welle, ethnopluralism, the Nouvelle Droite concept that different ethnicities require their own segregated living spaces, creates a need for remigration of people with "foreign roots". Scholar José Ángel Maldonado has compared the idea to a "soft type of ethnic cleansing under the guise of deportation and segregation."

Presented by far-right extremists as a remedy to mass immigration and the perceived Islamisation of Europe, remigration has increasingly become an integral policy position of the Identitarian movement. Research from the Institute for Strategic Dialogue, conducted in April 2019, showed a distinct rise in conversations about remigration on Twitter between 2012 and 2019.

Wider usage 
The term remigration stems from Classical Latin remigrāre, "to return home", and was first used in English in the writings of Andrew Willet, an early 17th century Church of England theologian. It originally refers to the voluntary return of an immigrant to their place of origin and is still used as such in social science. In German, the word involves the return of an individual to their ethnic community, without a necessary connection to a country of origin.

Origins and development 
Early evocations of the modern far-right concept of remigration can be found in French 1960s movements such as Europe-Action, considered the "embryonic form" of the Nouvelle Droite. Jean-Pierre Stirbois, then General Secretary of the National Front (FN), was the first to coin the expression "we will make them leave" ('on les renverra') in an interview. He was the architect of the first electoral breakthrough of the FN in 1983, earning nearly 17% of the votes in the city of Dreux with the promise of "inverting the migratory flows". The idea is also expressed in the German slogan "Deutschland den Deutschen, Ausländer raus" ('Germany to Germans, foreigners out'), and in the motto of L'Œuvre Française "La France aux Français" ('France to the French').

Since the 2010s, the Identitarian movement has engaged in forms of agitprop, or "cultural struggle", in an attempt to push remigration towards the centre of the political debate. The term is closely related to the concept of the Great Replacement, which states that the white Christian European population is being progressively replaced with non-European populations, specifically from North Africa and the Middle East, through mass migration, demographic growth, and a European drop in the birth rate.

Proponents of remigration often use the historical example of the expulsion of Pieds-Noirs from Algeria in 1962 as a successful past instance of organized forced remigration, even though the exodus is described by some historians as an ethnic cleansing stimulated by violence and threats from the National Liberation Front (FLN) and part of the native Muslim population, as evidenced by the slogan "the suitcase or the coffin" promoted by the FLN, the kidnappings of Pieds-Noirs, or the Oran massacre of 1962.

Modern use 
Since the 2010s, the idea of remigration has been used by thinkers and political leaders of the Identitarian movement, such as Guillaume Faye, Renaud Camus, Henry de Lesquen, or Martin Sellner, as a euphemism for the mass deportation of non-European immigrants and native residents with a migrant background, back to their country of origin, the criteria of exclusion being a vaguely defined degree of assimilation into European culture.

In August 2017, protestors flew banners throughout Quebec City, calling for the remigration of non-whites from the Quebec capital. That same month, it was reported how Identity Evropa, who later rebranded themselves as the American Identity Movement, supported the remigration of immigrants from the United States.

In August 2018, Australian far-right extremist Blair Cottrell openly advocated for remigration, calling for the deportation of "enemies of my country" and the execution of immigrants who refused to leave.

Austria 
In March 2019, just a week after the Christchurch mosque shootings and release of the shooter's manifesto (called The Great Replacement), Identitäre Bewegung Österreich, the Austria branch of Generation Identity (GI), held a rally in Vienna, protesting the supposed Great Replacement of Austrians and openly calling for remigration of residents with a migrant background. By April 2019, a branch of the FPÖ party, who at the time were in coalition government as a junior partner with the ÖVP, announced a "national call for remigration".

France 

In October 2017, Generation Identity announced policy plans to its members, for France to force former colonies to take back migrants by using its status as a nuclear power and making development subsidies and aid conditional on the repatriation of immigrants.

In March 2018, an Al Jazeera investigative team released footage and audio revealing Marine Le Pen's close confidant and former accountant, Nicolas Crochet, saying that the National Rally party would introduce a remigration programme to force immigrants back to their country of origin, in the event that they came to power in France.

In February 2019, speaking with L'Opinion, Debout la France candidate Emmanuelle Gave (daughter of French entrepreneur ), advocated for remigration as a policy for voters in the European Parliament elections in May. In what Libération described as a "dangerous penetration of the ideas of the ultra-radical extreme right in the French political space", Gave announced that she was in favor of the party putting remigration "on the table".

According to an IFOP poll conducted in March 2022 prior to the French presidential elections, 63% of French people claim "not to be shocked" by the use of the word "remigration" and 66% support the idea of remigrating illegal immigrants, foreign criminals and "Fiche S" foreigners.

According to an OpinionWay poll from March 2022, 55% of French people also support the establishment of a Ministry of Remigration, an idea proposed by Eric Zemmour during the French presidential elections campaign.

Germany 
In March 2018, Identitarian protesters were arrested for trespassing on the roof of Frankfurt Central Station, and hanging a banner that reads "Endstation Multikulti. Notbremse ziehen. Remigration" (Terminal station Multikulti. Pull emergency brake. Remigration), while chanting phrases like "home, freedom, tradition" from a megaphone.

In March 2019, the German Identitarian movement began a "remigration campaign" which included governmental petitions, a "flashmob" outside a mosque and a demonstration in front of the Federal Ministry of the Interior, Building and Community in Berlin, where the protesters demanded the repatriation of Islamic refugees back to the Middle East. It was reported that the group were distributing posters aimed at Syrian refugees that read "The war is over. Syria needs you" and referenced a "remigration policy".

In May 2019, Katrin Ebner-Steiner, leader of AfD in Bavaria, indicated that the deportation of non-whites from Germany was a preferable policy to racial integration, after she called for "Remigration instead of integration" at a conference for the Southern wing of the party.

Ahead of the 2019 European Parliament election, Germany's opposition party, the far-right Alternative for Germany, made remigration part of their policy platform, openly calling for "remigration, instead of mass immigration", and stating that "Germany and Europe must put in place remigration programs on the largest possible scale". AfD MP Markus Frohnmaier has repeatedly worn a slogan reading "Remigration Ministry" into the Bundestag.

United Kingdom 
Generation Identity UK and Ireland activists have engaged in the promotion of remigration. In April 2018, Hope Not Hate detailed how, while the group was releveantely unknown by the mainstream media; its "core beliefs" of ethnopluralism, and remigration of non-whites from Europe, was more extreme than any policies of the English Defence League. In May 2018, The Times was reporting how the extremist organization was promoting the singling out of black British people for priority remigration from the UK.

Other 
According to Nick Lowles, one of the authors of a report by Hope not Hate, in a related concept, members of the counter-jihad movement "believe there will be a confrontation between Islam and the West and there can be no accommodation so the only solution can be to expel followers of Islam from Britain and Europe". The influential Norwegian counter-jihad blogger Fjordman himself stated in his writings in June 2011 that "Islam, and all those who practice it, must be totally and physically removed from the entire Western world".

Criticism 
Michael Weiss and Julia Ebner, of the Institute for Strategic Dialogue, have identified the "identitarian concept of 'remigration'" as having accelerated since 2014, and associated it with increasing calls from the far-right for mass deportation of non-white Europeans, in what they described as "ethnic cleansing".

 has described remigration as a form of demagoguery that would lead to ethnic cleansing. Arguing that France has had a mixed genetic heritage since Gallic times, he has questioned the practicality of expelling French people of immigrant origin and the number of generations that would require investigation in pursuit of "purity".

See also 
 Deportation
White nationalism
 Identitarian movement
 Nativism
 Great Replacement
 Back-to-Africa movement
 American Colonization Society

References

Further reading 
 
 
 

White genocide conspiracy theory
Counter-jihad
Identitarian movement
Anti-immigration politics
Anti-immigration politics in Europe